The Clarkson Golden Knights women's ice hockey program represented Clarkson University during the
2010–11 NCAA women's ice hockey season. The Golden Knights secured their seventh consecutive appearance in the ECAC playoffs, but failed to qualify for their second NCAA tournament.

Recruiting

Schedule

|-
!colspan=12 style=""| Regular Season

|-
!colspan=12 style=""| ECAC Hockey Tournament

Awards and honors

 Lauren Dahm – ECAC Hockey Goaltender of the Week (10/26), ECAC Hockey weekly Honor Roll (10/5, 10/19, 11/2, 11/30)
 Erica Howe – ECAC Hockey All-Rookie Team, ECAC Hockey Goaltender of the Week (2/1), ECAC Hockey weekly Honor Roll (11/2, 11/30, 1/17, 1/24)
 Carly Mercer – ECAC Hockey All-Rookie Team, ECAC Hockey weekly Honor Roll (1/17, 2/1)
 Danielle Skirrow – ECAC Hockey Player of the Week (2/1), ECAC Hockey weekly Honor Roll (10/19, 11/2)
 Brittany Styner – ECAC Hockey weekly Honor Roll (2/7)
 Melissa Waldie – ECAC Hockey weekly Honor Roll (11/9, 1/24)

References

External links
Official site

Clarkson Golden Knights women's ice hockey seasons
CL
CL